This Crazy Heart is a 2017 German comedy film directed by Marc Rothemund, based on the book Dieses bescheuerte Herz: Über den Mut zu träumen by Lars Amend and Daniel Meyer.

Cast
 Elyas M'Barek - Lennard "Lenny" Reinhard
  - David Müller
  - Betty Müller
  - Dr. Reinhard
  - Dr. Julia Mann
 Jürgen Tonkel - Herr Petry

References

External links 

2017 films
2017 comedy films
German comedy films
2010s German-language films
Films directed by Marc Rothemund
2010s German films